The following is a partial list of oil, petroleum, and gas pipeline accidents in the United States between 1950 and 1974.

1950s 
 1950 On January 20, the "Big Inch" gas pipeline exploded and burned, near Caldwell, Ohio, causing 500 foot high flames, and damaging farm buildings. There were no injuries.
 1950 On March 13, an overhead pipeline at a refinery in Martinez, California leaked, causing flammable fumes to spread onto a highway. An automobile ignited the fumes, killing a woman, and injuring two others in the vehicle. 3 automobiles were also burned.
 1950 Three separate explosions on the Big Inch gas transmission pipeline near Colonia, New Jersey were announced on April 11 to be from hydrostatic testing of that pipeline for weaknesses.
 1950 On May 19, the "Little Big Inch" exploded, near Somerset, Ohio, causing a 40 foot wide and 25 foot deep crater. There was no fire or injuries. 
 1950 The "Big Inch" gas pipeline exploded and burned on July 1, near Beallsville, Ohio. A house and a barn were destroyed by the fire.
 1950 On July 10, the "Little Big Inch" gas pipeline exploded, near Jasper, Indiana, causing a 40 foot wide crater. There was no fire or injuries.  
 1950 On July 14, a gas main failed in Seattle, Washington, killing one person, and injuring 8 others. A nearby building was damaged by the explosion and fire.
 1950 Three workers were killed in an underground vault in Los Angeles, California on August 22, when a gas main exploded. There was no fire.
 1950 On September 7, a new natural gas pipeline exploded near Big Rapids, Michigan. Two barns were destroyed by the ensuing fire, which was seen for 50 miles.
 1950 A brand new natural gas transmission pipeline exploded, while initial pressure was building up, on September 20 near Wadley, Texas. About 300 yards of the pipe were ripped out of the ground.
 1950 On September 20, a river crossing of a gas transmission pipeline exploded and burned, near Roanoke, Alabama. There were no injuries. 
 1951 Two men welding on a crude oil pipeline at an oil Terminal in Kansas City, Kansas were severely burned on January 7, when a nearby valve failed, spraying them with crude oil that ignited. Both later died of their burns.
 1951 On January 10, two gas explosions, three hours apart, hit McKees Rock, Pennsylvania, injuring eight people, igniting a fire, and causing widespread damage.
 1951 On January 13, the "Big Inch" gas pipeline exploded and burned, near Oran, Missouri. 4 people were injured.
 1951 On February 9, natural gas leaked from a gas line into a sewer system in Jefferson, Pennsylvania. The gas was involved in three separate home explosions, causing other homes to burn. Two people were killed, eight others injured, and six homes destroyed.
 1951 A gas main pressure regulator failed in Rochester, New York on September 21, causing a series of explosion that lasted for four hours. Three people were killed, and 30 homes were destroyed.
 1951 A Halloween parade on October 31 in Pittsburgh, Pennsylvania was interrupted by four gas main explosions. 29 people were injured.
The explosion was heard for ten miles around. A pipeline compressor station under construction at the site was destroyed. A nearby elementary school was relocated following the failure.
 1952 On January 15, the "Big Inch" gas pipeline exploded and burned, near Oakland City, Indiana. 2 nearby railroad workers were injured.
 1952 On March 12, a fire broke out at an oil pump station, near Granger, Wyoming. There were no injuries reported.
 1952 On May 17, a brand new valve being added to the 20-inch "Little Inch" gas transmission pipeline split open near Marietta, Pennsylvania, knocking down pipeline company workers, two of whom were seriously injured. There was no fire.
 1952 On July 9, a gas transmission pipeline exploded and burned near York, Pennsylvania.
 1952 A tractor hit a gas pipeline, and a following explosion and fire killed two men, near Ackerly, Texas on July 17.
 1952 Four men working on an 8-inch gas pipeline near Mount Pleasant, Michigan were burned when that pipeline ruptured as they raised it for reconditioning on September 26.
 1952 On October 18, a 26-inch gas pipeline, a branch of the "Big Inch" pipeline, started leaking at an insulated flange in Liberty Corner, New Jersey. A road was closed during the leak.
 1952 On December 29, twelve persons were injured in a blast that shook the Lawndale district of Los Angeles, California, when a ditching machine broke a gasoline-carrying pipeline and touched off a fiery explosion.
 1953 On January 6, an explosion & fire on a gas pipeline in Edgerton, Wisconsin left 20,000 homes without gas service in cold weather. There were no injuries reported.
 1953 On February 9, the "Little Big Inch" gas pipeline exploded, near Somerset, Ohio. There were no injuries.
 1953 On September 10, a gas explosion in Cleveland, Ohio killed one person and injured 50 others.
 1953 The 20 inch "Big Inch" gas transmission pipeline exploded on October 18 near Uniontown, Pennsylvania, causing a massive fire that burned five acres of cornfields, and opened an 18 foot deep crater. There were no injuries reported.
 1953 A US Air Force T-33 trainer jet crashed into a natural gas pipeline bridge over the Mississippi River on November 24 near Greenville, Mississippi, rupturing and igniting the pipeline.
 1954 On January 17, a Panhandle Eastern gas transmission pipeline exploded in Lucas County, Ohio, causing some nearby residents to evacuate and a crater 60 feet long, 10 feet deep, and 8 feet wide. Two other explosions had occurred on this pipeline in the previous two years in Lucas County, but a Panhandle Eastern representative said the three explosions were just a coincidence.
 1954 A 40- to 50-year-old LP gas distribution line was blamed for causing an explosion in Goldsboro, North Carolina on April 12 that killed five people, injured 15 others, and demolished three buildings.
 1955 On February 15, a 20-inch Cities Service pipeline exploded south of Lawrence, Kansas, ejecting a 20-foot section of pipeline. There was no fire or injuries.
 1955 The "Big Inch" gas pipeline exploded and burned near Roseville, Ohio on March 7.
 1955 On March 9, a pipeline construction crew of four were killed while trying to move a pipeline for the building of a toll road in Chesterton, Indiana. Two other pipeline workers were injured, and a school a quarter mile away was evacuated.
 1955 A burst pipeline at a refinery in Sunburst, Montana contaminated groundwater and soil in the area. In 2004, local residents and a school district won a lawsuit for payment of damages.
 1955 A bulldozer ruptured and ignited a gas pipeline in Brookshire, Texas. Flames reached , and the bulldozer operator was killed.
 1955 On August 10, a gas leak in Ashtabula, Ohio was ignited by electrical equipment or lightning, causing a restaurant to explode. 21 people were killed, 15 more were injured, and six buildings were destroyed.
 1955 A gas pipeline being tested in Detroit, Michigan exploded and burned on September 7, injuring one person, and destroying 50 cars.
 1955 On October 10, a crew cleaning the outside of a natural gas pipeline with a heavy rubber ball ruptured a coupler, causing an explosion and fire east of Orleans, Indiana. Two members of the crew were killed, and three others were injured.
 1955 A drag-line operation in a gravel pit in Irving, Texas ruptured an 8-inch diameter gasoline pipeline on November 30. One home was destroyed, but the family living there was away at the time of the explosion.
 1956 On February 11, a corroded gas line from a gas main leaked, causing an explosion that killed three people at a meat packing plant in Toledo, Ohio.
 1956 A trench-digging machine being used in building a freeway cut into a gasoline pipeline in West Los Angeles, California on February 27. At least three people were burned, with nine homes, a warehouse, and a laundry catching on fire.
 1956 On April 26, a new 26-inch gas transmission line was being pressure-tested near Moab, Utah when the gas exploded, then burned, causing damage to a utility pole, and damaging a half-mile of the pipeline. Mines in the region were shut down due to the lack of power. There were no injuries.
 1956 A butane pipeline ruptured on October 16, forcing 25 families to evacuate from flammable fumes near Greenwich, Ohio. Trains were also stopped in the area, until the fumes dissipated. There were no injuries.
 1957 On January 16, an explosion and fire occurred at a natural gas compressor station in Liberal, Kansas, killing three workers at that station. Eleven other workers were injured, and the fire burned for two hours. The shut-down of this gas pipeline from the explosion affected customers as far away as Ohio in sub-zero weather conditions.
 1957 Two explosions from a natural gas main killed three people in Peoria, Illinois on January 17. Seven others were injured, and a home and a two-story building were leveled.
 1957 On January 23, the "Little Inch" gas transmission pipeline exploded and burned near York, Pennsylvania, causing flames that reached 200 feet high. There were no injuries.
 1957 A leaking gas main in Reno, Nevada led to three explosions on February 6. Two people were killed, 42 others injured, and five buildings were destroyed.
 1957 On June 3, a 26-inch natural gas transmission pipeline exploded and burned near Ellinwood, Kansas, destroying a farm house. One person was injured.
 1957 On August 6, 6 workers were injured in a fire and explosion, at a compressor station of the "Big Inch" gas pipeline near New Lexington, Ohio. Welding was being done at the time.
 1957 On October 18, a 16-inch gas transmission pipeline burst 30 miles from Spokane, Washington, shutting down gas delivery to the Spokane area. A family near the rupture had to take cover.
 1957 On December 5, a gas line in the basement of a store that was being worked on in Villa Rica, Georgia, exploded. Thirteen people were killed in the explosion and ensuing fire. At least six stores were destroyed.
 1958 A natural gas metering station in Kimberly, Idaho exploded on February 17, killing two pipeline company workers, injuring another worker, and destroying the metering building. There was no fire.
 1958 On June 1, gas leaking from a pipeline near Big Spring, Texas was ignited and exploded, killing three fishermen and seriously burning another.
 1958 On June 12, a 12 inch gas pipeline exploded and burned, near Lucinda, Pennsylvania. Fire spread to nearby vegetation. There were no injuries. 
 1958 On June 22, the "Little Big Inch" gas pipeline exploded, near Davidsburg, Pennsylvania. Hydrostatic pressure testing was done on the pipeline afterwards, due to it being the fourth explosion on that pipeline in that area in the past 6 years.There was no injuries.
 1958 A truck missed a curve on a road and crashed into a gas transmission pipeline compressor station near Kings Mountain, North Carolina on September 16. There was an explosion and fire, and the two men in the truck were killed.
 1958 On October 4, a gasoline pipeline was ruptured by a bulldozer in Hobbs, New Mexico. The gasoline ignited, injuring three people, damaging six homes, and threatening a number of other homes for a time.
 1958 On November 9, a jet fuel pipeline ruptured near the Blue Creek in Idaho. Fuel flowed down the creek, and later ignited, damaging one home and destroying six bridges. Several people fell sick from the fumes.
 1958 A leaking and burning gas line under a street led to several explosions at a hotel in Allentown, Pennsylvania on December 14. Seven people were killed and 23 others injured.
 1959 On April 29, a 20-inch pipeline owned by Laurel Pipeline ruptured, near Hollidaysburg, Pennsylvania, spilling thousands of gallons of gasoline onto fields and into streams. Earthen dams were built to reduce the amount of gasoline spilling into fishing streams. The pipeline had been recently built.
 1959 On May 22, a Buckeye Partners oil pipeline ruptured in Sylvania, Ohio, spouting up in the lawn of a homeowner.
 1959 A worker on a gas transmission pipeline was closing a valve, when it exploded near Newton, Pennsylvania on September 25. The worker was killed, and another worker was injured.
 1959 On October 8, a 10-inch propane pipeline burst in Austin, Texas. 400 families had to be evacuated, due to the explosion and fire hazard. Eventually, the fumes dissipated without incident. The rupture was caused by a weak section of pipe.
 1959 On November 1, a Plantation Pipeline line ruptured in Concord, Tennessee burst, contaminating farm land and a pond with gasoline.l There was no fire.

1960s

 1960 On January 16, a 30 inch gas transmission pipeline exploded & burned, near Elmwood, Nebraska. Flames threatened a nearby farm for a time. There were no injuries.
 1960 Transwestern Pipeline Co.'s gas line 58 miles northwest of Roswell N.M. suffered an 8.1-mile brittle fracture, during testing of the 30-inch X56 pipeline. It failed at about 850 psi.
 1960 An estimated 125,000 persons in southwest Missouri were without gas in subfreezing temperatures for several days due to a ditch-digging machine rupturing a pipeline.
 1960 On Saturday, March 19, a leaking 1 1/2 inch gas line led to gas migrating through a sewer line, from a church into a school, in Wauseon, Ohio. The gas later exploded, damaging the school and injuring six.  Classes were not in session at that time.
 1960 In July, excavation work in Merrill, Wisconsin caused a gas leak and gas explosion that killed ten people.
 1960 A ditching machine used in laying a water main hit an 8-inch natural gas pipeline in Sarasota, Florida on October 5. Nine people were injured in the ensuing explosion and fire.
 1960 On October 26, a 16-inch gas transmission pipeline near Checotah, Oklahoma exploded while it was being worked on, to repair a leak. Three of the repair crew died, and three others were injured.
 1960 On December 12, a leaking 8-inch pipeline at a tanker dock in Richmond, California spilled gasoline into the San Francisco Bay.
 1960 A 30-inch gas transmission pipeline exploded and burned at a gas sub-station in Huntington, West Virginia on December 19. Windows were broken, one home was damaged, and brush burned, but there were no injuries.
 1961 On January 4, a gas pipeline failure near Waynesburg, Pennsylvania ignited, causing a fire that was widely seen in the area. There were no injuries.
 1961 On February 22, a pipeline exploded and burned in a refinery in Borger, Texas, killing nine members of a construction crew, and burning another crewman.
 1961 The main City of Miami, Florida Garage was destroyed by a gas explosion on February 23. The blast was caused by a ditch-digging machine being used in the garage hitting and rupturing a 2-inch gas pipe. One person was seriously burned by the blast, and two fire-fighters were injured fighting the fire that followed the blast.
 1961 On May 29, a 20 inch natural gas pipeline exploded and burned, in North Saint Louis County, Missouri. Two people 300 feet from the blast suffered burns.
 1961 A Transcontinental Pipeline 36-inch gas transmission pipeline exploded near Laurel, Mississippi on June 18. Ten people were injured, and one home was destroyed by flames that went hundreds of feet in the air.
 1961 On August 12, a bulldozer hit a gasoline pipeline, near Rochelle, Illinois. An estimated 50,000 gallons of gasoline was spilled, but there was no fire or injuries.
 1961 A 26-inch gas transmission pipeline exploded and burned near Trapp, Kentucky on September 10. 22 people suffered various burn injuries.
 1961 On October 9, vapors from a leaking pipeline on an oil storage tank exploded and burned in Bridgeport, Illinois. Four oil company workers were killed, and three others injured.
 1961 On October 21, two workers bleeding a gas pipeline, in Santa Clarita, California, were injured when gas vapors were ignited, and, one of them later died from the injuries.
 1961 On November 19, a gas pipeline exploded and burned near Warrenton, Virginia. There were no injuries.
 1961 An 18-inch natural gas pipeline exploded and burned near Cadiz, Ohio on November 25. There were no injuries or damage.
 1962 On January 29, a crew installing a pipeline hit a nearby Dow Chemical Company ethylene pipeline with a bulldozer, causing an explosion and fire, near Brazoria, Texas. One of the crew was killed, and six others were burned.
 1962 Gas leaking from a 10-inch natural gas transmission pipeline exploded on February 20 in Portage, Ohio, injuring six people and destroying a home.
 1962 On April 24, an earth mover hit a 10-inch Buckeye Partners pipeline in Sylvania, Ohio, causing a geyser of naphtha, which flowed into the Ten Mile Creek. Nearby schools were impacted.
 1962 On June 14, a backhoe ruptured a gas transmission pipeline near Idaho Falls, Idaho. The escaping gas exploded and ignited later on while a crew was trying to repair the line. One of the crew was killed, and five others injured in the fire.
 1962 On August 2, a natural gas transmission pipeline exploded and burned in Clearwater, Florida, next to US Highway 19, forcing that road's closure for a time. There were no injuries reported. Investigators found the cause of the failure was previous mechanical damage to the line.
 1962 A 30-inch gas transmission failed on August 3 in Kansas City, Missouri. The gas flowed for ten minutes before exploding and igniting. An 8-inch gas distribution pipeline was also ruptured, eleven homes were destroyed, and 23 others were damaged. At least one person was injured.
 1962 On September 11, an 8-inch propane/LPG pipeline was ruptured by road building equipment near Eatonton, Georgia. One of the road workers was overcome and asphyxiated by the propane fumes. Propane fumes followed the Oconee River for  into Lake Sinclair.
 1962 On October 17, a gas main in Kansas City, Missouri exploded and burned, with flames 100 feet high, causing serious damage to one home, and minor damage to others. There were no injuries.
 1963 On January 2, a gas transmission pipeline ruptured, due to a defective weld, in San Francisco, California. The gas ignited, one firefighter died from a heart attack, and nine other firefighters were injured fighting the resulting inferno.
 1963 On January 10, a pipeline spilled gasoline across US 27 in Coldwater, Michigan. There were no injuries or ignition.
 1963 A leaking gas main led to an explosion in three homes that killed a man and injured several more in Bethlehem, Pennsylvania on January 26.
 1963 An explosion and fire spread through a gas pipeline compressor station in Montezuma, Indiana on March 12, injuring 16 workers.
 1963 On April 3, a bulldozer cut through a propane pipeline, in Tylertown, Mississippi. Propane fumes spread over a 10 square mile area, with some residents voluntarily evacuating. There was no injuries, fire, or explosion.
 1963 On September 10, lightning hit a pressure regulator assembly on a gas transmission pipeline, near Harrisonville, Missouri. A fire followed that. There were no injuries reported.
 1963 On September 18, crews installing a 12-inch pipeline hit an 8-inch Buckeye Partners pipeline in Monroe, Michigan, releasing some petroleum product. Traffic in that area was snarled, and several homes nearby were voluntarily evacuated.
 1963 A crude oil pipeline was hit and ruptured by an earth mover near Fostoria, Ohio, on October 30. The earth mover operator was seriously burned in the resulting fire.
 1963 On October 31, a 6-inch butane pipeline was ruptured by an earth mover near West Millgrove, Ohio. The equipment operator was critically burned by the following explosion and fire.
 1963 On November 17, flammable liquids leaking from a pipeline disposal pit were accidentally ignited, killing a teen planning to cook alongside a creek in South Carolina.
 1963 In December, a break occurred in a high-pressure steel petroleum pipeline, crossing the Chattahoochee River, about 5 miles above the intake for the Atlanta, Georgia, water supply. Before the petroleum main could be shut down, some 60,000 gal of kerosene had spilled into the contiguous swampy area and flowed into the river water, forcing extra treatment by the water Department.
 1963 On December 25, a fire broke out at a crude oil pipeline storage tank, at a terminal, in Lima, Ohio. Nearby residents were evacuated for a time, but, there were no injuries.
 1964 A Santa Fe Railroad Freight Train apparently ignited fumes, from a leaking propane pipeline, near Bosworth, Missouri on February 4. The explosion and fire ignited four diesel locomotives and some box cars, and derailed other box cars. One member of the rail crew was injured.
 1964 On February 7, two workers installing insulation on a valve in a manhole in Richardson, Texas were overcome by gas and killed when an 8-inch pipeline in the vault ruptured.
 1964 A front loader ruptured a gas pipeline in Fort Worth, Texas on February 28, seriously burning the loader operator.
 1964 On May 12, a bulldozer hit and broke a valve on an LPG pipeline near Demopolis, Alabama while grading land. The resulting fire caused fears of flames spreading to an underground storage facility, but the fire was later controlled. There were no injuries.
 1964 On August 22, crews working on an extension of Plantation Pipeline in Ferry Farms, Virginia hit a natural gas pipeline. Gas escaped for over three hours before it was shut off.
 1964 On September 1, a 24-inch natural gas transmission pipeline being worked on exploded near Pratt, Kansas, burning nine of the crew.
 1964 A crude oil pipeline ruptured in Gilbertown, Alabama on October 29.
 1964 A gas line being moved in Miami, Florida exploded and burned on November 18. Four people were injured.
 1964 On November 25, a recently replace natural gas transmission pipeline exploded and burned in Saint Francisville, Louisiana, killing five workers on the pipeline, and injuring at least 23 others.
 1964 On December 25, a 12 inch butane pipeline exploded and burned, near El Dorado, Kansas. A fuel tank nearby was destroyed, but there were no injuries.
 1965 On January 6, a house in Garnett, Kansas was destroyed by an explosion, and later on gas was found leaking from a 2-inch gas line in the street front of it, and was thought to be the cause. A young boy was killed. The same leak may have caused another nearby house explosion the previous November.
The propane spread along the ground, and exploded several hours later, scorching an area over a mile wide. A girl being dropped off at a school bus stop was severely burned and later died, as well as her father, and one other person were burned.
 1965 A 32-inch gas transmission pipeline, north of Natchitoches, Louisiana, belonging to the Tennessee Gas Pipeline exploded and burned from stress corrosion cracking (SCC) on March 4, killing 17 people. At least nine others were injured, and seven homes 450 feet from the rupture were destroyed. This accident, and others of the era, led then-President Lyndon B. Johnson to call for the formation of a national pipeline safety agency in 1967. The same pipeline had also had an explosion on May 9, 1955, just  from the 1965 failure.
The ruptured pipeline was reported to flow "wide open" for over an hour.
 1965 On April 28, a butane pipeline ruptured in Conroe, Texas, forcing residents in an eight-block area to evacuate.
 1965 On July 24, a natural gas pipeline exploded and burned when workers were welding a tie-in pipeline onto it near Tescott, Kansas. One of the workers died, and 15 others were injured.
 1965 On August 21, a 9-year-old girl was killed and eight people were injured in a Buckeye Partners pipeline explosion in western Van Wert County, Ohio. A home about 800 yards away was shifted off of its foundation, and half a mile of railroad ties were set on fire. The girl killed was in her bed in a house 300 yards from the blast site. The rest of her family were injured. Investigators said the explosion was caused by gas leaking from an 8-inch pipeline, and was apparently ignited by a spark from a passing train.
 1965 On August 22, three workers were seriously injured while working on the Magnolia pipeline, in Abilene, Texas. 
 1965 An 8-inch diameter Buckeye Partners gasoline pipeline ruptured in Sylvania, Ohio on August 23. The danger of fire or explosion forced evacuations of residents in a  area. There was no fire.
 1965 On October 25, a ruptured Buckeye Partners pipeline spilled naphtha in Mount Cory, Ohio, forcing evacuations until the naphtha evaporated.
 1965 In November, two workers cutting into a pipeline at a natural gas liquids storage facility in Mont Belvieu, Texas accidentally caused an explosion and fire, which killed both workers, forced 1,700 residents to evacuate, and caused petrochemical businesses in the area to shut down.
 A survey by the Federal Power Commission of 51 gas pipeline companies showed that between January 1, 1950, and June 30, 1965 gas transmission pipeline failures had killed 64 people and injured another 222. Of the fatalities, 35 were gas pipeline company workers or contractors, and 29 were members of the public.
 1966 On January 10, a new 36-inch gas transmission pipeline exploded and burned during cleaning operations, near Larose, Louisiana, killing four pipeline workers, and burning three others.
 1966 A 6-inch natural gas pipeline ruptured in Norfolk, Nebraska on January 28, shutting off gas to 20,000 people in ten communities.
 1966 On March 28, a 30 inch gas transmission pipeline owned by El Paso Natural Gas blew out and ignited, near Grants, New Mexico. The resulting fire destroyed 900 yards of railroad track. There were no injuries. 
 1966 On June 5, a crew working to install a sewer near Oklahoma City, Oklahoma ruptured a gas pipeline. One member of the crew was killed, and, 7 others injured.
 1966 On July 1, a break in an 8-inch Buckeye Partners pipeline Co. line spilled thousands of gallons of crude oil into a field and the sewer system of Findlay, Ohio.
 1966 On December 14, a leaking propane pipeline near Swedeborg, Missouri made a car stall. Others came to the aid of the stalled car, and someone lit a cigarette, igniting the fumes. Eight people were burned and hospitalized.

1967

1968

1969

1970

1971

1972

1973

1974

References

Lists of pipeline accidents in the United States